Skalica (Latin: Sakolcium) is the largest town in Skalica District in western Slovakia in the Záhorie region. Located near the Czech border, Skalica has a population of around 15,000.

Etymology
The name is derived from Slovak word skala (a rock) referring to the cliffs the inhabitants built their settlement over.  The first written record of Skalica was made in 1217 as Szacholca.

History
The site has been inhabited since 4000 BC and was part of the Great Moravian Empire. From the second half of the 10th century until 1918, it was part of the Kingdom of Hungary.  The settlement developed around a triangular plaza, which was rare during the Middle Ages. Its town privileges were conferred in 1372 by King Louis I of Hungary. In 1428 Skalica became a bastion for the Hussites; during the Hussite Wars, the majority of its then predominantly German-speaking populace fled or was exiled. Many Habaners (adherents of a sect similar to Anabaptism) settled in Skalica in the 16th century. 

On 6 November 1918 Skalica became the seat of the Temporary Government of Slovakia, for ten days de facto capital of Slovakia. The Temporary Government led by Vavro Šrobár declared here a sovereignty of the Czechoslovak state, published a newspaper Sloboda (Liberty) and unsuccessfully tried to negotiate the removal of Hungarian troops from Upper Hungary (today Slovakia).

After World War II, the town tried to take advantage of its position as a district town, and many new works, schools and apartments blocks were built, while successfully preserving its historical city centre. In 1960, Skalica became part of Senica district. This lasted until 1996, when Skalica became a separate district again.

Didaktik computers were produced in Skalica during the 1980s. The 2006 European Table Hockey Championships were held in the town.

A popular pastry called trdelník is made in Skalica. Now sold all over Slovakia and Czechia, this unusual "stove-pipe" shaped pastry has its origins in Transylvania. 

Today, it is economically the strongest town in the Záhorie region, bypassing its rival town Senica for this position, and is becoming a tourist destination thanks to its preserved town centre and historical monuments.

Sights

Near the remnants of one of Skalica's city walls is one of Slovakia's oldest works of construction, the Romanesque Rotunda of St. George. Although its exact date of origin is unknown, it was constructed by the 12th century at the latest.  A Baroque dome was attached to it in the 17th century. The city has several churches, including a Jesuit church and monastery, the 15th century Parish Church of St. Michael, and the 15th century Franciscan church and monastery. Other sights are Skalica's Late Renaissance town hall and the Skalica Culture House built in the Art Nouveau with elements of Czech and Slovak folklore.

Demographics
According to the 2001 census, the town had 15,013 inhabitants. 94.84% of inhabitants were Slovaks, 3.61% Czechs and 0.61% Roma. The religious make-up was 70.15% Roman Catholics, 19.92% people with no religious affiliation and 6.67% Lutherans.

Sports
 HK 36 Skalica, ice hockey club from the town and MFK Skalica, football club in the Slovak Super Liga.

 ŠK Bandy hokej Skalica is one of three bandy clubs in Slovakia. In 2019 it won the rink bandy league.

Notable people
Béla II of Hungary, king
János Csernoch, primate of Hungary
Ján Hollý, poet, studied in Skalica
Gyula Juhász, poet
Milan Mišík, geologist, university professor
Žigmund Pálffy, ice hockey player
Marián Varga, musician
František Krištof Veselý, actor and singer
Miroslav Zálešák, ice hockey player

Twin towns — sister cities

Skalica is twinned with:

 Schwechat, Austria
 Freyburg, Germany
 Gladbeck, Germany
 Strážnice, Czech Republic
 Uherské Hradiště, Czech Republic
 Slaný, Czech Republic
 Arcueil, France

Gallery

See also
 List of municipalities and towns in Slovakia

References

External links 

Official page
Municipal website
Churches of Skalica 
Stamp of Rotunda of St. George

Cities and towns in Slovakia